KFGI (101.5 FM; "Skeeter 101.5") is a radio station broadcasting a variety hits format. Established in 1990 as KTCF-FM, the station is licensed to Crosby, Minnesota, United States, and serves the Brainerd and Baxter region of central Minnesota. Its studios are at 212 N 5th Street, in Brainerd. The transmitter site is on County Road 6, between Crosby and Emily.

History
Its former "KQ101.5" classic rock format had originated at then-sister station KQDS-FM in Duluth. On September 1, 2011 the station began carrying the "SAM FM" variety hits format. It was KFGI's fourth format change in a decade, going from country music to oldies in 2002, and then back to country in 2004 after an ownership change, and then to classic rock in 2007. Following the shutdown of Sam FM, 101.5 shifted to Jack FM during Labor Day weekend of 2015.

On September 16, 2016 Red Rock Radio announced that it would sell KFGI to R & J Broadcasting as part of an eight station deal;[2] the sale was completed on December 21, 2016.[3] Following the sale, KFGI became a local station, keeping the variety hits format, but rebranding as "Skeeter 101.5".

References

External links

Radio stations in Minnesota
Adult hits radio stations in the United States
Radio stations established in 1990
1990 establishments in Minnesota